Anaphase-promoting complex subunit 7 is an enzyme that in humans is encoded by the ANAPC7 gene. Multiple transcript variants encoding different isoforms have been found for this gene.

Function 

This gene encodes a tetratricopeptide repeat containing component of the anaphase-promoting complex/cyclosome (APC/C), a large E3 ubiquitin ligase that controls cell cycle progression by targeting a number of cell cycle regulators such as B-type cyclins for 26S proteasome-mediated degradation through ubiquitination. The encoded protein is required for proper protein ubiquitination function of APC/C and for the interaction of APC/C with certain transcription coactivators.

Interactions
ANAPC7 has been shown to interact with ANAPC1, ANAPC4,  CDC27 and CDC20.

References

External links

Further reading